The Christopher Newport Captains (also CNU Captains) are the athletic teams that represent Christopher Newport University, located in Newport News, Virginia, in NCAA Division III intercollegiate sports. The Captains compete as members of the Coast to Coast Athletic Conference (C2C) for the majority of varsity sports except for football, which plays in the New Jersey Athletic Conference and men's lacrosse, which plays in the Coastal Lacrosse Conference. The football team remains a NJAC associate member because C2C does not sponsor football.

Varsity teams

List of teams

Men's sports
 Baseball
 Basketball
 Cross Country
 Football
 Golf
 Lacrosse
 Sailing
 Soccer
 Tennis
 Track & Field

Women's sports
 Basketball
 Cross Country
 Field Hockey
 Golf
 Lacrosse
 Sailing
 Soccer
 Softball
 Tennis
 Track & Field
 Volleyball

National championships

Team

Individual sports

Baseball
The Captains baseball team has made 10 appearances in the NCAA Division III baseball tournament, notably finishing in 3rd and 2nd place in 2002 and 2003, respectively, under the coaching of John Harvell. The CNU baseball team has fielded 10 All American Athletes.

Basketball

The CNU Men's basketball team holds an impressive .683 percent victory percentage (as of the end of the 2021-22 season) and 16 All-American Athlete honors over its almost 60 years of existence. The men's team has reached the final four of the D-III tournament twice, in 2016 and 2019. CNU has also produced NBA player Lamont Strothers.

In 2023, the Captains won their first Men's D-III National Championship over Mount Union with a last second, buzzer-beater layup by junior Trey Barber, 74–72.

The Women's basketball team, started in 1971, sports an overall win percentage at .669 (as of the end of the 2021-22 season) and has fielded 7 All-American Athlete honors. The women's team has reached the final four of the D-III tournament twice, in 2011 and 2017, and have made the national championship game in the 2023 tournament.

Cross country
The CNU Men's Cross Country team holds an impressive historical roster with over 110 first team All-Dixie/USA South Conference awards and 65 All Mason-Dixon Conference awards.  The CNU Women's Cross Country team holds over 50 First team All-Dixie/USA South Conference awards and 42 All Mason-Dixon Conference awards. The men's team has also produced 4 All-American athletes with 1 award each.

Field hockey
The women's Field Hockey Team has been coached by Carrie Moura since 2003. In 2013, the team reached the Final Four in the NCAA Division III National Tournament, the Elite Eight in 2006, and the Sweet Sixteen a total of six times. The team has had five All-Americans and numerous all region players.

Football

With most CNU sports having been established for 20 years or more, CNU Football is one of the newer sports teams at Christopher Newport.  Started in 2001 under head coach Matt Kelchner, the team made it to the NCAA play-offs 10 times between 2001 and 2014. The Captains were the first team in NCAA history to win a conference title and advance to the NCAA playoffs in their first year of play - and finished the regular season no lower than second place during their entire tenure competing in the USA South Athletic Conference. The Captains football team began competing in the New Jersey Athletic Conference in 2015. Since joining the NJAC, the Captains have suffered a playoff drought (as of the end of the 2022 season). Their current head coach is Paul Crowley.

Lacrosse
CNU men's lacrosse inaugural season was 2007 and was competitive from the start.  In 2013, the Captains reached the NCAA Division III tournament for the first time. CNU reached the NCAA D-III 3rd round in 2018, and most notably, the final four in 2021. In 2022, the team became a charter member of the new Coastal Lacrosse Conference.

The CNU women's lacrosse team was founded in 2001, and has made the D-III tournament a total of eight times as of 2022, advancing as far as the Sweet Sixteen in 2013.

Soccer

Seth Roland was head coach of the soccer team from 1982 to 1987. The men's team has made 13 appearances in the NCAA Division III Men's Soccer Championship, reaching as high as the Elite Eight in 2000, 2008, 2009, and 2014.

The women's team has an impressive win percentage of .849 since their inception in 1997 (as of the end of the 2021-22 season). Most notably, they earned Christopher Newport's first National Championship title in the 2021 tournament.

Softball
The university’s softball team placed 2nd in the NCAA Division III Softball Championship in 2011, and won Christopher Newport's second NCAA National Championship Title in 2022.

Tennis
The CNU men's tennis team has recently come onto the Division III tennis scene after years in the shadows. The men won the USA South Conference title for the regular season and the Conference Tournament for the first time in almost a decade in 2017. The team players had several wins over Division I opponents and sophomore Eddie Glidewell finished in the Top 35 in the Nation. He joined five other players to reach this distinction - Holden Knight, Detlef Schultz, Jason Martin, and Hugh Spain.

Track & field
The CNU track has an impressive historical roster with 62 national championship titles held by 31 different athletes.  Also, the track team has received a total of 511 All-American Athlete awards among 119 different athletes.

Volleyball
The CNU women's volleyball team was established in 1977, and has enjoyed considerable success in recent years under head coach Lindsay Birch. The Captains have appeared in every NCAA D-III tournament since 2006 (with the exception of 2020, which was cancelled due to COVID-19). Their most successful season was 2011, where they were national runners-up.

Club sports
CNU sports club programs include ice hockey, equestrian, dressage, cycling, fishing, lacrosse, martial arts,  rock climbing, rugby, scuba diving, silver storm dance, soccer, swimming, table tennis, tennis, ultimate frisbee and volleyball.

CNU F.C.
CNU FC officially became a school-recognized club in 2005. It was started by Phill Condrey (President), Steven Mohn (Vice-President), Jason Semko (Secretary), Scott Siclari (Treasurer), and Jeremy Wells. CNU FC

CNU Ice hockey
The CNU ice hockey team is a club sport at CNU and is a member of the ACHA and BRHC. The CNU Ice Hockey club was formed in the fall of 2004. The team just completed its ninth season of play, finishing with the team's first Conference Championship, defeating Loyola University in overtime. See the CNU Men's Ice Hockey website at: .

CNU Rugby
The CNU Rugby team was founded as a club sport in the Fall of 2000.  They are a member of the Virginia Rugby Union, Division III.
And are 2009 DIII State Champs as well as 2012 V.R.U. Champions.

CNU Martial Arts Club
The CNU MAC was established by Skyler Brady in 2009.  CNU MAC is a competitive mixed martial arts team that trains in Brazilian jiu-jitsu, wrestling, kickboxing and Muay Thai. The team hosted its first tournament, The Captain's Invitational on October 31, 2010. CNUMAC

CNU Men's Club Volleyball
CNU Men's Volleyball club holds practices 3 days a week, and attends at least 3 tournaments a semester. Current president is Andrew Thompson (senior).

CNU Swimming Club
The CNU Swimming Club is not a widely recognized club at CNU as there is no pool on campus. When asked about the club many would reply, "We have a swim team?" The club competes with other swim clubs around Virginia and even out of state colleges. Recently, the CNU team won its first meet which was against Loyola University, Ohio University, and Mary Washington University. The club looks to expand in the coming years, which will hopefully bring a pool to CNU's campus.

References

External links